Lambig (also known as Fine Bretagne, gwinardant, eau de vie or lagout) is a Breton brandy produced by distilling cider. Per AOC, lambig must be aged for a minimum of two years on oak. The beverage is equivalent to the calvados of Normandy. 

Lambig can be added to apple juice to fortify it, creating pommeau de Bretagne.

References

Distilled ciders
Breton cuisine